Ptychobarbus is a genus of cyprinid fish that is found in rivers, streams and lakes in the Himalayas and Tibetan Plateau of China, India, Nepal and Pakistan, extending into the highlands of Afghanistan. They mostly feed on benthic invertebrates, but will also take planktonic organisms, aquatic plants and algae.

Ptychobarbus is a part of the schizothoracines (snowtrout and allies), which also includes the genera Aspiorhynchus, Chuanchia, Diptychus, Gymnodiptychus, Gymnocypris, Oxygymnocypris, Platypharodon, Schizopyge, Schizopygopsis and Schizothorax.

Species
There are currently four described species in the genus:

 Ptychobarbus chungtienensis (W. H. Tsao, 1964)
 Ptychobarbus conirostris Steindachner, 1866 (Indus snowtrout)
 Ptychobarbus dipogon (Regan, 1905)
 Ptychobarbus kaznakovi A. M. Nikolskii, 1903

References

Cyprinid fish of Asia
Cyprinidae genera